The British 12th Destroyer Flotilla, or Twelfth Destroyer Flotilla, was a naval formation of the Royal Navy from November 1915 to March 1919 and again from September 1939 to 2 July 1943.

History

World War One
The flotilla was first formed in November 1915 and was assigned to the Grand Fleet.  Between 31 May and 1 June 1916 it was present at the Battle of Jutland then commanded by Captain Anselan J. B. Stirling. It remained with the Grand Fleet until November 1918 and was disbanded in March 1919.

Second World War
In September 1939 the flotilla was re-established and allocated to the Western Approaches Command and stationed at Portland till December 1939 when it was reassigned to the Home Fleet till May 1941 when its ships were dispersed among other formations. It reformed again on 29 January 1943 as part of the Mediterranean Fleet and was part of forces covering the East Mediterranean area till 2 July 1943 when it was abolished.

Administration

Captains (D) afloat 12th Destroyer Flotilla
Incomplete list of post holders included:

Composition
Included: 
, Western Approaches Command September 1939

12th Destroyer Flotilla
 HMS Exmouth (Leader)

Division 23
 HMS Eclipse
 HMS Electra

Division 24
 HMS Encounter
 HMS Escapade
 HMS Escort

References

Sources
 Harley, Simon; Lovell, Tony. (2018) "Twelfth Destroyer Flotilla (Royal Navy) - The Dreadnought Project". www.dreadnoughtproject.org. Harley and Lovell, 29 May 2018. Retrieved 9 July 2018.
 Kindell, Don. (2012) "ROYAL NAVY SHIPS, SEPTEMBER 1939". naval-history.net. Gordon Smith.
 Watson, Dr Graham. (2015) Royal Navy Organisation and Ship Deployments 1900-1914". www.naval-history.net. G. Smith. 
 Watson, Dr Graham. (2015) "Royal Navy Organisation and Ship Deployment, Inter-War Years 1919-1938". www.naval-history.net. Gordon Smith.
 Watson, Dr Graham. (2015) "Royal Navy Organisation in World War 2, 1939-1945". www.naval-history.net. Gordon Smith.
 Willmott, H. P. (2009). The Last Century of Sea Power, Volume 1: From Port Arthur to Chanak, 1894–1922. Bloomington, IN, USA: Indiana University Press. .

Destroyer flotillas of the Royal Navy
Military units and formations established in 1915
Military units and formations disestablished in 1919
Military units and formations established in 1939
Military units and formations disestablished in 1943